Arnold Phillips (born 24 March 1988) better known by his stage name Aewon Wolf, is a South African rapper, singer, Director and songwriter born in Durban, KwaZulu-Natal. He is also the co – founder of the Durban creative collective called The wolfpack. He is also the founder of The Werehouse a lifestyle centre and events venue in city of Durban that has contributed a lot to the development of the Durban creative scene.

Discography

Albums

Mixtapes

Extended plays

Singles

Awards and nominations

Endorsements 
Aewon Wolf was hired by Cell C, a South African mobile phone company, to endorse its "Mega Bonus" and "Mega Data" pre-paid phone products.

References

External links 

 

Living people
Musicians from Durban
People from KwaZulu-Natal
South African hip hop musicians
South African rappers
1988 births